WVOW could refer to:

WVOW (AM), a radio station (1290 AM) licensed to Logan, West Virginia, United States
WVOW-FM, a radio station (101.9 FM) licensed to Logan, West Virginia, United States